The Good Love is a 1963 Spanish drama film directed by Francisco Regueiro. It was entered into the 1963 Cannes Film Festival. The plot follows a young couple spending the day in Toledo.

Cast

References

External links

1963 films
1960s Spanish-language films
1963 drama films
Spanish black-and-white films
Films directed by Francisco Regueiro
1960s Spanish films
Films set in Toledo, Spain